The Men's 400m T54 had its First Round held on September 8 at 10:05, its Semifinals on September 9 at 20:35 and its Final on September 10 at 21:00.

Medalists

Results

References
Round 1 - Heat 1
Round 1 - Heat 2
Round 1 - Heat 3
Round 1 - Heat 4
Semifinal - Heat 1
Semifinal - Heat 2
Final

Athletics at the 2008 Summer Paralympics